Kifayat al-Talib al-Labib fi Khasa'is al-Habib shortly known as al-Khasa'is al-Kubra is an Islamic book written by Egyptian Muslim scholar Jalal al-Din al-Suyuti (1445–1505 CE). The book deals with the miracles attributed to Islamic prophet, Muhammad.

Structure 

The book is divided into two parts. The first part basically describes the various miraculous and extraordinary events related and attributed to Muhammad. These include events before his birth up to the Tabouk expedition. Notable among the miracles described in the first part of this book are:
 Events preceding his birth
 Events during his birth
 Events during his trip to Syria at age 12
 Quran as ultimate miracle
 Isra and Mi'raj
 Splitting of the moon
 events during the Battle of the Trench

See also 
 Tafsir al-Jalalayn
 Dur al-Manthur
 History of the Caliphs

External links 
 Urdu version online

References 

Biographies of Muhammad
Sunni literature
Books by al-Suyuti